The 2008–09 Torquay United F.C. season was Torquay United's second consecutive season in the Conference National.  The season runs from 1 July 2008 to 30 June 2009.

Overview
Despite gaining just five points from their first seven games, which saw the Gulls languishing in 18th place in the Conference, manager Paul Buckle soon set Torquay on a run of form which saw the team achieve a club record of seventeen games unbeaten.

Torquay also enjoyed their most successful FA Cup run since 1990.  After easing through a qualifying round against Chipstead, the Gulls then had to see off Evesham and Oxford to set up a Third Round clash with Championship side Blackpool.  In one of the major upsets of the Third Round, the Gulls won the match 1–0 against a side placed three leagues above them.  However, they were to narrowly lose their Fourth Round tie to Coventry, also of the Championship, thanks to an 87th-minute header from Elliott Ward.

The 2008–09 season was also notable for the departure of two of Torquay's longest serving players. After a brief appearance in the 2008 FA Trophy Final defeat, Torquay's all-time leading appearance maker Kevin Hill made his official departure in July.  Later in the season the Gulls also said farewell to another stalwart as defender Steve Woods left the club in April after an eight-year spell encompassing 281 appearances.

The season ultimately finished in thrilling style when, after beating Conference Champions Burton Albion on the final day of the season, Torquay qualified for the Play-off Semi-finals in which they beat Histon 2–1 on aggregate over two legs.  The result meant the Gulls would make their second visit to Wembley in two seasons. However, unlike the previous season, the Torquay fans were treated to a 2–0 victory over Cambridge United thanks to goals from Chris Hargreaves and leading scorer Tim Sills.  The win secured Torquay United's return to the Football League after a two-year absence.

League statistics

Conference National

Results summary

Results by round

Season diary
 1 July: Club record appearance holder Kevin Hill leaves to join Dorchester Town on a free transfer
 14 July: Mustapha Carayol joins from Milton Keynes Dons on a two-year contract
 18 July: Michael Poke re-joins on loan from Southampton
 13 August: Martin Rice joins Truro City on loan until the end of the season
 9 September: Roscoe Dsane and Michael Brough are made available for loan
 25 September: Goalkeeper Scott Bevan joins on loan from Shrewsbury Town as cover for the injured Michael Poke (himself a loanee).
 19 November: Torquay defender Chris Todd announces that he has been diagnosed with leukaemia
 19 November: Torquay set a new club record number of games without defeat
 3 December: Torquay's club record unbeaten run of 17 games ends with defeat away to Forest Green Rovers in the Conference League Cup
 1 January: Scott Bevan joins on an 18-month contract from Shrewsbury Town
 2 January: Tristan Plummer joins on loan from Bristol City until the end of the season
 3 January: Torquay defeat Championship side Blackpool in the FA Cup 3rd Round
 14 January: Striker Tim Sills signs a new contract until the end of the 2009–10 season
 20 January: Former striker Jamie Ward moves from Chesterfield to Sheffield United for an initial fee of £330,000, triggering a 25% sell-on clause
 24 January: Torquay exit FA Cup after 1–0 defeat at home to Coventry City
 31 January: Tristan Plummer ends his loan spell early and returns to Bristol City
 31 January: Torquay exit FA Trophy after 3–0 defeat Away to Southport
 2 February: Striker Iyseden Christie joins on a free transfer from Stevenage Borough, signing a contract until the end of the season
 2 February: Defenders Chris Todd and Michael Brough join Salisbury City on a month's loan
 4 March: Trainee Jordan Charran leaves the club
 20 March: Chris Todd returns to the club after his loan spell at Salisbury City
 27 March: Swindon Town Striker Blair Sturrock joins the club on loan until the end of the season
 2 April: Defender Steve Woods leaves Torquay United after eight years and 281 appearances
 9 April: Michael Brough returns after his loan deal with Salisbury City ends
 26 April: In a tense final game of the season, Torquay beat Burton Albion 2–1 to finish fourth and secure a place in the Conference National play-offs. Despite Burton losing, the result is enough to crown them the Conference champions
 27 April: Striker Roscoe Dsane leaves the club
 4 May: Despite a 1–0 second leg defeat to Histon, Torquay win the Conference Play-offs 2–1 on aggregate to book a place in the Conference National play-off final at Wembley against Cambridge United.
 17 May: Torquay Utd are promoted back to the Football League after beating Cambridge United 2–0 in front of a crowd of over 35,000 at Wembley
 21 May: United celebrate their return to the Football League with a victory parade through the streets of Torquay.
 22 May: Defender Kevin Nicholson signs a new one-year deal with the club.
 1 Jun: Striker Iyseden Christie is released by the club.
 2 Jun: Goalkeeper Martin Rice signs a new one-year contract after having spent the majority of the season on loan to Truro City.
 16 Jun: Skipper Chris Hargreaves agrees a new one-year deal in a role involving both playing and coaching.
 23 Jun: Striker Matt Green agrees a season long loan to Oxford Utd.

Match of the season
CAMBRIDGE UNITED 0–2 TORQUAY UNITEDConference National Play-off FinalWembley Stadium, 17 May 2009 

Torquay United's second trip to Wembley in two seasons was only made possible by the slenderest of margins.  After having sneaked into the play-offs by beating Conference champions Burton Albion on the final day of the season, the Gulls only just managed to beat third placed Histon 2–1 on aggregate in the play-off semi-finals.  They now faced the final hurdle preventing them from returning to the Football League after a two-year absence: a play-off final with the team who had finished second in the Conference, Cambridge United.

Cambridge had been defeated in the previous year's play-off final by Torquay's arch-rivals Exeter City (who had also knocked the Gulls out in the same year's semi final).  As such, they were eager to make it second time lucky, although, having experienced defeat themselves in the previous year's FA Trophy Final at Wembley, the Gulls were also keen not to repeat the disappointment of the previous season.  Although Cambridge began the brighter of the two sides, it was Torquay (wearing their white and blue away strip) who took the lead through captain Chris Hargreaves after 35 minutes.  Cambridge had more chances in the second half, but their cause was hindered when defender Phil Bolland was sent off after a second yellow card for a tackle on Elliot Benyon in the 70th minute.  Striker Tim Sills effectively sealed the victory five minutes later after he headed home a pin-point cross from winger Wayne Carlisle.

The score remained 2–0 until the final whistle, and Torquay United could finally celebrate their return to the Football League after two years in the Conference.

Results

Conference National

Conference National play-offs

FA Cup

FA Trophy

Conference League Cup

Friendlies

South West Challenge Cup

Devon St Luke's Bowl

Club statistics

First team appearances

Source: Torquay United, soccerbase
Substitute appearances in brackets. Total excludes FA Cup Qualifying Round and Conference League Cup.

Transfers

In

Out

Loans In

Loans out

References

Torquay United F.C. seasons
Torquay United